is a Japanese football player. He currently plays for Yokohama FC.

Club career statistics
Updated to 18 February 2019.

International career
On 7 May 2015, Japan's coach Vahid Halilhodžić called him for a two-days training camp. Rokutan received his first call up to the senior Japan team in August 2015 for 2018 FIFA World Cup qualifiers against Cambodia and Afghanistan.

Honours
Yokohama F. Marinos
Emperor's Cup: 2013

References

External links
Profile at Shimizu S-Pulse 

1987 births
Living people
Association football people from Kagoshima Prefecture
Japanese footballers
J1 League players
J2 League players
Avispa Fukuoka players
Yokohama F. Marinos players
Vegalta Sendai players
Shimizu S-Pulse players
Yokohama FC players
Association football goalkeepers